Iran: From Religious Dispute to Revolution is a book by scholar Michael M.J. Fischer, written in 1980. The book is about the role of Islam in Iran and its relation to the 1979 Iranian revolution. The book was first published by Harvard University Press in 1980.

Synopsis 
The work examines Islam in Iran and its relation to the 1979 Iranian revolution and draws heavily on Fischer's experiences with practitioners in the holy city of Qum. He pays particularly close examination to the Madrasa, which Fischer calls "the scriptural school".

Reception 
The work has received reviews from Middle Eastern Studies, Journal of the American Academy of Religion, American Anthropologist, and Political Science Quarterly.

References

Further reading
The University of Wisconsin Press review

Books about Islam and society
Books about the Iranian Revolution
Islam in Iran
Harvard University Press books